Kuuk (old spelling: Kûk) is a former settlement in the Avannaata municipality in northwestern Greenland. It was located in the north-central part of Upernavik Archipelago, on the southern cape of Mernoq Island, an island in Tasiusaq Bay. The settlement was abandoned in 1972.

References 

Former populated places in Greenland
Tasiusaq Bay
Upernavik Archipelago